Beatrice Gründler (or Gruendler; born 24 August 1964, in Offenburg) is a German Arabist and Professor of Arabic Language and Literature at Free University of Berlin and President of the American Oriental Society. She was awarded the Gottfried Wilhelm Leibniz Prize 2017 of the German Research Foundation.

Biography 
Beatrice Gründler studied Arabic language and literature, Semitic Studies, and Assyriology at University of Strasbourg, France, University of Tübingen, Germany, und Harvard University, U.S., where she completed her doctorate in 1995 in Near Eastern Languages and Civilisations.

After a visiting professorship at Dartmouth College, New Hampshire, she taught from 1996 at Yale University, first as assistant professor and, since 2002, as full professor for Arabic literature.

In the academic year 2010–2011 Gründler was Fellow at the Berlin Institute for Advanced Study with the project The Islamic Age of Communication

In 2014 she returned to Germany permanently, where she teaches and conducts research at Free University of Berlin.

Gründler is Principal Investigator of the Friedrich Schlegel Graduate School of Literary Studies and the Berlin Graduate School Muslim Cultures and Societies. There she leads together with Dimitri Gutas, Professor of Graeco-Arabic Studies at Yale University and Einstein Visiting Fellow, the project Aristotle's Poetics in the West (of India) from Antiquity to the Renaissance. A Multilingual Edition with Studies of the Cultural Contexts of the Syriac, Arabic, Hebrew, and Latin Translations funded by the Einstein Foundation.

Gründler is member of the Board of Directors of the Dahlem Humanities Center at Freie Universität Berlin.

Since 2016 she is President of the American Oriental Society.

Research 
Gründler’s areas of research include classical Arabic literature and its social context, the integration of literary theory into the study of Near Eastern literatures, the history of the Arabic languages, Arabic paleography, the history of the Arabic book, and the connection between Arabic and other premodern literatures.	

Gründler understands Arabic as a cosmopolitan language:In premodern times (i.e. from the seventh to the nineteenth century) Arabic was a learned language, and it served as a medium for many writers of other mother tongues, such as Iranians, Jews, Byzantine Greeks, Visigoths, and others. Arabic assembled the voices of individuals of various ethnic and religious backgrounds. All of these formed part of the Arabic-Islamic commonwealth.The German Research Foundation motivated the awarding of the Leibniz-Prize 2017 (the most important prize supporting research in Germany) to Gründler as follows:Beatrice Gründler receives the Leibniz-Prize for her studies of the polyphonic nature of Arabic poetry and culture. Early in her career she devoted herself to the medium of script, recognizing its fundamental importance for the Arabic tradition, notably with her book The Development of the Arabic Script (1993). Based on her research, she finally developed a complex history of the media of the Arab world, beginning with the introduction of paper and extending to book printing and beyond. Gründler speaks in this context of an "Arabic book revolution." With her pilot project of a critical digital and commented edition of Kalila wa-Dimna, begun in 2015, Gründler is making accessible the genesis, textual history, and reception of one of the earliest Arabic prose texts and a central work of Arabic wisdom literature. In her work, Gründler practices herself in a model way the encounter of the Arabic and European traditions of knowledge which she investigates, and this makes her research all the more significant.

Publications

As author 
The Life and Times of Abū Tammām by Abū Bakr Muḥammad ibn Yaḥyā al-Ṣūlī preceded by al-Ṣūlī’s Epistle to Abū l-Layth Muzāḥim ibn Fātik, edition and translation, Library of Arabic Literature. New York and London: New York Press, 2015. 

Book Culture before Print: The Early History of Arabic Media. The American University of Beirut, The Margaret Weyerhaeuser Jewett Chair of Arabic. Occasional Papers, 2012.

Medieval Arabic Praise Poetry: Ibn al-Rūmī and the Patron’s Redemption. London: RoutledgeCurzon 2003. Paperback edition, London: Routledge, 2010. 

The Development of the Arabic Scripts: From the Nabatean Era to the First Islamic Century. Harvard Semitic Studies 43, Atlanta: Scholars Press, 1993.

As editor 

Classical Arabic Humanities in Their Own Terms. Festschrift for Wolfhart Heinrichs on his 65th Birthday Presented by His Students and Colleagues. Leiden: Brill, 2007

(together with Louise Marlow) Writers and Rulers. Perspectives from Abbasid to Safavid Times. Literaturen im Kontext: Arabisch – Persisch – Türkisch, Vol. 16. Wiesbaden: Reichert, 2004

(together with Verena Klemm) Understanding Near Eastern Literatures: A Spectrum of Interdisciplinary Approaches. Literaturen im Kontext: Arabisch – Persisch – Türkisch, Vol. 1. Wiesbaden: Reichert, 2000

For a complete list of publications, see.

References

External links 
 Beatrice Gründler und Michael Marx, Papyrus — Pergament — Papier. Über den medialen Wandel der arabischen Buchkunst, Abendkolloquium, Wissenschaftkolleg zu Berlin, 26 January 2011, Retrieved 2017-02-03 (German)
 Arabische Schrift als Chiffre und Spielfeld, lecture, 19 October 2012, Retrieved 2017-02-03 (German)
 M. Lynx Qualey, “It’s a kaleidoscope”: An Interview with Beatrice Gruendler on the ideal text for showing the importance of poetry in 9th-century Baghdad (Part One), The Library of Arabic Literature, Retrieved 2017-02-03 (English)
 M. Lynx Qualey, An Interview with Beatrice Gründler on ‘sleepless nights’ spent translating the Life ad Times of Abū Tammām (Part Two), The Library of Arabic Literature, Retrieved 2017-02-03 (English)
 Osama Amin, Abu Tammam zu Gast in der Universität Leiden”, Al-Qafila Magazin, Bd. 65, Nr. 3, Mai-Juni 2016, Retrieved 2017-02-03 (Arabic)
 Christine Boldt, “Ich bin an der Freien Universität an einem idealen Platz” Online Magazin Campusleben, Free University of Berlin, Retrieved 2017-02-03 (German)
 Informationsdienst Wissenschaft or idw (The Science Information Service), Retrieved 2017-02-03 (German)
 Amory Burchard, Weisheiten aus der Kalifenzeit, Der Tagesspiegel, Retrieved 2017-02-03 (German)

People from Offenburg
Living people
German Arabists
1964 births
Academic staff of the Free University of Berlin
Yale University faculty
University of Strasbourg alumni
Harvard Graduate School of Arts and Sciences alumni
University of Tübingen alumni
European Research Council grantees